Lawrence (Larry) Raymond Schaeffer (born 3 April 1947) is an American geneticist, and emeritus professor of animal breeding and genetics at the University of Guelph, Guelph, Ontario, Canada.

Biography 
Larry Schaeffer was born in Chicago, Illinois, US, and grew up in the state of Indiana. In 1965 he attended Purdue University in West Lafayette, Indiana where he studied animal sciences and graduated with a Bachelor of Science. In 1969 he moved to Cornell University, Ithaca, New York, where he studied Quantitative Genetics under Henderson and Van Vleck. By 1971 he received a Master of Science and in 1973 received his doctorate (PhD).

Schaeffer then moved to the University of Guelph in Guelph, Ontario. Here he joined the Centre for Genetic Improvement of Livestock (CGIL). On July 7, 2011, he was awarded emeritus status.

Work 
Since the mid-1970s, Schaeffer had aided livestock breeders in understanding new mathematical methods and solutions to apply within breeding evaluations. Over the last few years he has also encouraged breeders and breeding companies to include genomic information into their breeding evaluations. Schaeffer published his results extensively, allowing them to pass into the public domain.

Starting in 1975 Schaeffer developed new methodologies in the area of variance component estimation and breeding value estimation in farm animals. From 1975 through the 1980s, he further developed the "BLUP" methodology with the solution of large systems of equations incorporating all kinship relationships. After 1990 Schaeffer developed theoretical and practical implementations in the evaluation of individual control data (test day data) using larger computer capacities. By 1994 the ability to compare international breeding values was ensured through the Multiple Across Country Evaluation (MACE) Model. This international breeding value estimation was carried out in Sweden by Interbull (a permanent Sub-Committee of the International Committee For Animal Recording (ICAR)). In 2006 the inclusion of genomic information in the form of single-base polymorphisms (SNPs) in breeding value estimation became part of many breeding organizations. Schaeffer has produced more than 170 works in magazines and books as well as 387 journal articles.

Schaeffer's most recent work involved monitoring genetic evaluation systems for dairy and meat sheep. He also worked on an Atlantic Salmon project with Dr. Elizabeth Boulding (University of Guelph) that used genomics to evaluate Canadian fish for disease resistance.

Honours and awards
 1988: Lush Award from the American Dairy Science Association
 2009: Hermann von Nathusius Medal of the German Society for Breeding Studies
 Member of the Scientific Advisory Board of Interbull in Sweden

Selected publications

References 

Living people
Academic staff of the University of Guelph
American geneticists
University of Guelph
Cornell University alumni
1947 births